= Ethanur =

- Village
- Location in Kerala, India Ethanur (India)
- Coordinates: 10°40′0″N 76°38′0″E
- Country: India
- State: Kerala
- District: Palakkad

Languages
  - Official: Malayalam, English
- Time zone: UTC+5:30 (IST)
- PIN: 678502
- Telephone code: 0492
- Vehicle registration: KL-9
- Nearest city: Palakkad
- Lok Sabha constituency: Alathur

Ethanur is a village which is situated in Kerala at southern side of Palakkad district (12 km).
